The eared pygmy tyrant (Myiornis auricularis) is a species of bird in the family Tyrannidae. It is found in Brazil, Paraguay and northeastern Argentina. Its natural habitats are subtropical or tropical moist lowland forest and heavily degraded former forest. The birds are usually found in humid forest and at edges, from sea level to 1200 m, and looking for food in lower growth or the midstory. Their main source of food is insects and their nests are usually found quite low above the ground, shaped like a purse, with a side entrance.

References

eared pygmy tyrant
Birds of the Atlantic Forest
eared pygmy tyrant
Taxa named by Louis Jean Pierre Vieillot
Taxonomy articles created by Polbot